Shabbir Sayyad is a social activist from Maharashtra, India known for his works toward welfare of animals and cow protection. He has been taken care of over 100 cattles in the draught ridden district of Beed in Maharashtra. In 2019, he received Padma Shri, India's 4th highest civilian award. His father, Noorjade Sayyad, started the practice of cattle rearing in 1970s And Shabbir born in 26 March 2000s in the city of Mumbai and he help his father in the age of 12 .Shabbir is known to not earn money by selling milk or meat of cow but only sells cowdung. He sells bulls only for agricultural usage in farms.today 18 November 2022s he is died.We respect him.26th March 2000 to 18th November 2022

References 

Living people
Social workers
Recipients of the Padma Shri in social work
Social workers from Maharashtra
Year of birth missing (living people)